General Sir Frank Edward Kitson,  (born 15 December 1926) is a retired British Army officer and writer on military subjects, notably low intensity operations. He rose to be Commander-in-Chief UK Land Forces from 1982 to 1985 and was Aide-de-Camp General to Queen Elizabeth II from 1983 to 1985.

Early life and education
Kitson is the son of Vice Admiral Sir Henry Kitson and Marjorie de Pass, daughter of Sir Eliot Arthur de Pass. His uncle Frank de Pass was the first Jewish recipient of the Victoria Cross. Kitson was educated at Stowe School.

Military career
Kitson joined the British Army as a second lieutenant on an emergency commission in the Rifle Brigade (The Prince Consort's Own) on 23 February 1946. He was appointed to a regular commission as a lieutenant on 10 April 1948 (with seniority from 15 December 1947), and promoted to captain on 15 December 1953. He was awarded the Military Cross (MC) on 1 January 1955 for service in the Mau Mau Uprising in Kenya, and was awarded a Bar to it on 23 May 1958, for service in the Malayan Emergency the previous year. The citation for the Bar read:

Kitson was appointed a Member of the Order of the British Empire in the 1959 Queen's Birthday Honours. He was promoted major on 15 December 1960, brevet lieutenant-colonel on 1 July 1964, and to the substantive rank on 31 December 1966.  He was appointed an Officer of the Order of the British Empire (OBE) in the 1968 New Year Honours. He was promoted colonel on 31 December 1969 (with seniority from 30 June 1969), and brigadier on 30 June 1970.

From September 1970 Kitson commanded 39 Airportable Brigade, which comprised eight (frequently changing) battalions on short four-month tours.  A further brigade was usually attached as brigade reserve, but this could be employed elsewhere as required. On 15 February 1972 he was promoted Commander of the Order of the British Empire (CBE) for his operational service in Northern Ireland the previous year. According to Belfast politician Paddy Devlin, Kitson "probably did more than any other individual to sour relations between the Catholic community and the security forces" in Northern Ireland. On 22 January 1976 he became General Officer Commanding 2 Division, with the acting rank of major-general, with substantive promotion following on 5 April 1976 (and seniority from 2 June 1974), and leading its re-designation as an Armoured Division in Germany before stepping down on 28 February 1978. He was then Commandant of the Staff College, Camberley, 5 March 1978 – 18 January 1980. He was appointed Knight Commander of the Order of the Bath (KCB) in the 1980 New Year Honours. On 17 March 1980 he was appointed Deputy Commander-in-Chief UK Land Forces and Inspector General Territorial Army, with substantive promotion to lieutenant-general (and seniority backdated to 17 August 1979). He held those appointments until 30 May 1982, and then became Commander-in-Chief, UK Land Forces on 1 July 1982 with local rank of general.

As is traditional for senior officers of the British Army, Kitson held a number of more honorary positions: Colonel Commandant of 2nd Battalion, Royal Green Jackets from 1 January 1979 to 1 January 1987; Honorary Colonel to the University of Oxford Officer Training Corps from 21 July 1982 to 21 July 1987; and Aide-de-Camp General to the Queen from 14 February 1983 to 1985. In 1985 he was promoted to Knight Grand Cross of the Order of the British Empire (GBE). He was appointed a Deputy Lieutenant of Devon on 19 June 1989.

In retirement Kitson has given evidence to the Saville Inquiry into the events of Bloody Sunday in Northern Ireland.

On 27 April 2015, Kitson and the Ministry of Defence were sued for negligence and misfeasance in office by Mary Heenan, the widow of Northern Irish foreman Eugene "Paddy" Heenan who was killed in 1973 by members of a loyalist paramilitary group, the Ulster Defence Association (UDA). The lawsuit claimed that Kitson was "liable personally for negligence and misfeasance in public office" due to the fact that he was supposedly "reckless as to whether state agents would be involved in murder".

Personal life
In 1962, Kitson married Elizabeth Spencer, whose father, Colonel Charles Spencer, was Colonel of the 12th Royal Lancers. Lady Kitson was appointed an OBE in the Queen's Birthday Honours List of June 2015, for her work with the Army Families Federation. They have three daughters: Catherine Alice, Rosemary Diana and Marion Ruth.

Selected bibliography
Kitson has written widely on gangs, counter-gangs and measures of deception, the use of defectors, and concepts such as pseudo-gangs and pseudo-operations.

Books
 Gangs and Counter-gangs. London: Barrie and Rockliff (1960).
 Low Intensity Operations: Subversion, Insurgency and Peacekeeping London: Faber and Faber (1971); Hamden, Con.: Archon Books (1974). .
 Bunch of Five. London: Faber and Faber (1977).
 Warfare as a Whole (1987).
 Directing Operations. London: Faber and Faber (1989). .
 Prince Rupert: Portrait of a Soldier. London: Constable & Robinson (1994). .
 Prince Rupert: Admiral and General-at-sea. London: Constable & Robinson (1998). . .
 Old Ironsides: The Military Biography of Oliver Cromwell. London: Weidenfeld & Nicolson (2004). .
 When Britannia Ruled the Waves: The Heyday of the Royal Navy, Through the Paintings of Vice Admiral Sir Henry Kitson, KBE, CB (1877–1952). Halsgrove (2007). .

Book contributions
 Foreword to Brush Fire Wars: Minor Campaigns of the British Army Since 1945 by Michael Dewar. New York: St. Martin's Press (1984) ; London: Robert Hale (1984) . . (pp. 9–10)

Reports
 Future Developments in Belfast: By Commander 39 Airportable Brigade (4 December 1971)

See also
False flag operations

Further reading
 Elkins, Caroline (July / August 2005). "The Wrong Lesson." The Atlantic Archived from the original. "Our counterinsurgency efforts abroad are starting to resemble the British Empire's."
 Staff writer (January / February 2006). "The Object Beyond War: Counterinsurgency and the Four Tools of Political Competition." Military Review. pp. 13–26. DTIC ADA489124.
 Griffin, Tom (22 December 2010). "The Military Response to Direct Action, General Kitson's Manual." OpenDemocracy.
 Bennett, Huw, and Rory Cormac (2013). "Low Intensity Operations in Theory and Practice: General Sir Frank Kitson as Warrior-Scholar" (Ch. 6). In: Mumford, Andrew and Bruno Reis (eds). The Theory and Practice of Irregular Warfare: Warrior-Scholarship in Counterinsurgency. Routledge. .

References

|-

|-
 

|-

1926 births
Living people
English people of Jewish descent
People educated at Stowe School
Rifle Brigade officers
Royal Green Jackets officers
British Army generals
British military personnel of the Mau Mau Uprising
Knights Grand Cross of the Order of the British Empire
Knights Commander of the Order of the Bath
Counterterrorism theorists
Counterinsurgency theorists
British military personnel of The Troubles (Northern Ireland)
British Army personnel of the Malayan Emergency
Recipients of the Military Cross
Commandants of the Staff College, Camberley
Deputy Lieutenants of Devon
People from Kensington
Military personnel from London